Alex Boniello (born October 5, 1990) is an American actor, musician, author, and producer best known for his portrayal of the voice of Moritz in the 2015 Broadway revival of Spring Awakening, as well as his performance as Connor Murphy in the Broadway production of Dear Evan Hansen. In 2019, he won the Tony Award for Best Musical as a producer for Hadestown.

Career 
Boniello grew up in Wood-Ridge, New Jersey and attended Wood-Ridge High School, where he began acting with roles like Lumiere in Beauty and the Beast and Mark Cohen in Rent. He enrolled at Wagner College, majoring in drama.

His start in professional theatre came with the touring company of American Idiot in 2013 as part of the ensemble. He also understudied the roles of Johnny and St. Jimmy. Boniello was also a member of the cast of 21 Chump Street in its 2014 premiere and is featured on the show's original cast album. 

In 2015, Boniello performed in the Off-Broadway production of Brooklynite. Later in the year, he was cast as the "Voice of Moritz" in the Deaf West Production of Spring Awakening, and stayed with the company with its transfer to Broadway. He completed his run at the Brooks Atkinson theatre on January 24, 2016. On April 13, 2018 it was announced that Boniello would be replacing Mike Faist as Connor Murphy in Dear Evan Hansen on Broadway. He made his debut in the role on May 15, 2018 and played his final performance on January 26, 2020 alongside co-star Andrew Barth Feldman.

As a producer, Boniello is known for his work on the Broadway musical Hadestown, for which he won the Tony Award for Best Musical in 2019.

During the COVID-19 pandemic, Boniello and Andrew Barth Feldman hosted Broadway Jackbox on Twitch, where they played games with fellow actors in order to raise money for Broadway for Racial Justice and the Actor's Fund. As the pandemic continued, he began streaming video games on his personal Twitch channel.

Boniello released his debut EP titled Hi on multiple platforms on January 8, 2021.

His debut work as a children's book author, A Case of the Zaps, will be published by Abrams Books in August 2022.

Personal life 

Boniello proposed to his long-term girlfriend, April Lavalle, on May 9, 2021. They have been together since college, and live together in New York City with their cat, Penny. They got married on October 31, 2022.

Boniello has suffered from an anxiety disorder since he was 17 years old.

Credits

Theatre Credits

Filmography

Discography

Extended plays

Singles

Awards and nominations

References 

1990 births
American male musical theatre actors
Living people
People from Wood-Ridge, New Jersey
Tony Award winners
Wagner College alumni